Conscience is a mental faculty that distinguishes right from wrong.

Conscience may also refer to:

Literature 
Of Conscience, essay by Michel de Montaigne; see Essais, Book II, Chapter 5
On Conscience book containing two essays by Pope Benedict XVI
 Conscience (magazine), online magazine published by Catholics for Choice

Music 
 Conscience (The Beloved album), 1993
 Conscience (Womack & Womack album), 1988
 "Conscience", a 1962 single by James Darren
 Conscience Records, a 1990s American record label
 Conscience, Canadian rapper in the collective Sweatshop Union
 Con-science is a song of Muse

Film and television 
 Conscience (1910 film), by Van Dyke Brooke, also called Conscience; or, The Baker Boy
 Conscience (1911 film), by D. W. Griffith
 Conscience (1912 film), by Van Dyke Brooke
 Conscience (1913 film), distributed by Universal Film Manufacturing Company
 Conscience (1914 film), by Walter Edwards
 Conscience (1915 film), by Stuart Paton
 Conscience (1917 film), by Bertram Bracken
 , 1920 film by Augusto Genina
 Conscience (1935 film),by Robert Boudrioz
Liang xin, 1961 film by Man Chan, released in English as Conscience
 , 1972 by Hysen Hakani, released in English as Conscience
 Conscience (2008 film), 2008 Turkish film
 "Conscience" (Law & Order: Criminal Intent), an episode of Law & Order: Criminal Intent

Other 
 Conscience: Taxes for Peace not War, London based peacebuilding organisation
 Conscience vote, a vote where legislators may vote according to their own personal conscience
 Social conscience
 Conscience is a french society specialized in robotics

Name 
 Hendrik Conscience (1812–1883), Belgian writer

See also
 Consciousness